The 1966 Notre Dame Fighting Irish football team represented the University of Notre Dame during the 1966 NCAA University Division football season.  The Irish, coached by Ara Parseghian, ended the season undefeated with nine wins and one tie, winning a national championship.  The Fighting Irish earned a consensus title after beating No. 10 Oklahoma 38–0 in Norman, tying unbeaten and No. 2 Michigan State 10–10, and ending the season defeating No. 10 USC, 51–0, in the Coliseum The 1966 squad became the eighth Irish team to win the national title and the first under Parseghian. The Irish outscored their opponents 362–38. The 10–10 tie between The Spartans and the Irish remains one of the controversial games of college football, and is considered today to be one of the great "games of the century".

Schedule

Roster

Rankings

Game summaries

Purdue

Northwestern

Army

North Carolina

Oklahoma

Navy

Pittsburgh

Duke

Michigan State

Southern Cal

Post-season

Award winners
Jim Lynch - Maxwell Award

Heisman Voting:
Nick Eddy, 3rd,
Terry Hanratty, 6th

All-Americans:

College Football Hall of Fame Inductees:

Notre Dame leads all universities in players inducted.

1967 NFL Draft

References

Notre Dame
Notre Dame Fighting Irish football seasons
College football national champions
College football undefeated seasons
Notre Dame Fighting Irish football